Xu Mengjie (born 19 June 1994), also known as Rainbow Xu, is a Chinese singer and actress. She is a former member of the Chinese girl group Rocket Girls 101.

Early life
Xu Mengjie was born in China, Jinhua City, Zhejiang Province. Since the age of 12, she has been helping her parents on their own barbecue restaurant, and is well-known as "Barbecue Xishi."

She has served as a special invited dancer for Zhejiang Television's large-scale programs such as Chinese Dream Festival,  I Love to Remember Lyrics and  I'm Not a Star.

Career

2015-2017: Career beginnings
In 2015, Xu officially joined LadyBees and became a Hive trainee. Hive trainees were made up of girls who did not make it into the main group, and who took part in the first and only LadyBees elections. In the succeeding year, she participated in the famous Jiangsu Broadcasting Corporation's variety show, The Brain.

In 2017, Xu ranked first place in the LadyBees popular ranking competition, and sixth  in the finals. During the same year, she also participated in LadyBees' music videos such as "Youth Etude", "No Feelings", "Dream Diary" and "I'm So Ok".

2018-2020: Produce 101 China, Rocket Girls 101

In 2018, Xu and two of LadyBees member were chosen to represent Zimei Tao Culture in the girl group survival show Produce 101 China. It aired from April 21 to June 23, 2018 on Tencent Video. In the final of the show, Xu finished 11th where she obtained a total of 83,772,852 votes, making her included in the final debut line-up. That same day she successfully debuted as Rocket Girls 101 member and released the song Rocket Girls.

In 2019, Xu made her acting debut as one of the protagonists in a web-series, Project 17: Spike, produced by Penguin Film and jointly produced by Mango TV. The play was broadcast on Tencent Video and Mango TV on September 24, 2019.

On June 23, 2020, Rocket Girls 101 officially disbanded as their time as a girl group was only limited to 2 years. After the group's disbandment, Xu returned to her original company to continue her career as a soloist. Later on, she appeared in Supernovae Games 3 and was named "Demon King" as she currently holds the fastest record for 50M dash with 7.92 seconds, breaking her own previous record 8.06 seconds.

2021-Present: Solo career
In January 2021, Xu terminated her contract with Asian Music Group (AMG), and established her own company, Beijing Hongtao Culture Communication Co., Ltd., as well as her own studio, Rainbow Dreamworks. 

On June 18, 2021, Xu made her solo debut by releasing her first extended play titled 11, with the title track "TAG". 

On August 10, 2021, Xu starred as a female protagonist in Mango TV's youth campus drama Our Secret, based on the popular Chinese novel Secrets in the Lattice. After landing the role of Ding Xian, Xu's popularity skyrocketed, launching her into stardom.

In November 2021, Xu was announced to join the cast of a hit drama, Twenty Your Life On for the second season. The show premiered on August 17, 2022 with 40 episodes.

Other ventures

Endorsements 
Aside from various endorsement with Rocket Girls 101, Xu has served  as brand ambassador individually. In March 2019,  Marc Jacobs Daisy Love Lady Eau de Toilette was launched, and it was announced that Xu became the promotion ambassador of Daisy Love Fragrance in China.

In 2020, Xu was selected as one of the ambassador of Move Free. She served as the face of their new product, together with three women of different ages. The following year, Xu was chosen as the first brand spokesperson of a Chinese clothing brand ELAND. 

On August 29, 2022, Seventeen Light Years, a luxury low-alcohol fruit wine collaborated with Twenty Your Life On 2 and selected Xu as their brand ambassador.

Discography

Extended plays

Singles

Soundtrack appearances

Songwriting credits

Filmography

Film

Television Series

Television Show

Notes

References

External links

 
 
 

1994 births
Living people
Singers from Zhejiang
Actresses from Zhejiang
People from Jinhua
Rocket Girls 101 members
Produce 101 (Chinese TV series) contestants
Chinese Mandopop singers
21st-century Chinese women singers
Chinese idols
Chinese television actresses
21st-century Chinese actresses